Hopeman is a seaside village in Moray, Scotland, it is situated on the coast of the Moray Firth, founded in 1805 to house and re-employ people displaced during the Highland clearances. According to the 2011 census, Hopeman has a population of 1,724 and approximately 701 households.

The village
The village was founded at the beginning of the nineteenth century as a fishing port by William Young of Inverugie.  It expanded when the new harbour was built in 1838 for the export of stone from the nearby quarries.
The old part of Hopeman has a grid-iron street layout. The main part of the village is set back from the beach and there is a village green with playing fields, a playground and a skate park). The B9012 passes west to east to the south of the village.

The main street, Harbour Street, runs north to south from the harbour to its junction with the B9012.  Shops and commercial establishments in Hopeman: Hopeman Stores and Post Office (Premier); Costcutters, a general store; Seahorse, a gift shop; a hairdresser and beauty salon; a butcher's shop; the Primrose Cafe; the Station Hotel; a chemist; a fish and chip shop and a Chinese carryout.  Down at the harbour are Footprints, a gallery and shop and Harbour blooms, a flower shop.

Hopeman Lodge, the largest house in Hopeman, occupies a commanding position on the east side of the village.  It was once used by nearby Gordonstoun school as a boarding house but now provides holiday flats for rent.

There is a caravan site on the coast for any campers.

During the summer the village organises a hugely popular gala which runs for a whole week. Activities range from traditional sandcastle competitions through to rock concerts, fancy dress parades, Songs of Praise and an Arts and Craft Fete. 2014 will see the village celebrate the 40th anniversary of its gala, which will commence on 19 July.

Phayrelands is to the west of the village on the main road towards Cummingston.

Beaches and harbour
Hopeman has two large sandy beaches split by the man-made harbour. The West Beach is the smaller. The East Beach is surrounded by large, grassy sand dunes, and has colourful beach huts and large rocky areas with excellent rockpools (the one at the eastern edge is known as Daisy Rock). Further to the east is a smaller hidden beach with stones and large rock formations.

There are quite a few birds to be found on the beach, such as the herring gull, the great black-backed gull, the black-headed gull, the curlew and the oystercatcher. The areas of gorse heathland surrounding the eastern beaches are home to the whitethroat, the robin and the yellowhammer.

Now and then bottlenose dolphins turn up in the Moray Firth off the coast of Hopeman, from where they can easily be seen.

Hopeman Harbour is in between the East and West Beaches. It is small and now mainly houses pleasure vessels. In the past it was used for landing fish caught by fishermen from the village.

The harbour is home to the Gordonstoun seamanship department and, whilst the school's yacht is berthed elsewhere, the smaller craft used for sail-training are berthed here.

The marina in the harbour was installed by Moray Council in 2008.

Education
Hopeman Primary School is on the East side of the village and has around 250 pupils. The catchment area includes Hopeman and the nearby villages of Duffus and Cummingston. There are nine classes in the school. It is split into three houses, Duff, Cameron and Gordon, for an inter-house competition in summer. At lunch time, primary 4 to primary 7 kids get a chance to go down to sea park at their lunch break.

Gordonstoun School is but a few miles away and provides an all-round education based upon the principles of its founder Kurt Hahn.

Places of Worship
The Hopeman Kirk was built and dedicated around 1857.  Originally a daughter church of Burghead Free Church of Scotland, it became part of the United Free Church of Scotland in 1901 and then, by the union of 1929, rejoined the Church of Scotland. In 1979 the Hopeman Kirk became formally linked with the Duffus Kirk and the Spynie Kirk, and together they form one church in three locations.

Before starting Hopeman Baptist Church in 1898, the founding members walked to Lossiemouth Baptist Church every Sunday for worship. After several years the people from Hopeman formed a local congregation, erecting a building and establishing themselves in the village. Hopeman Baptist Church is affiliated with the Baptist Union of Scotland, and they meet regularly for worship, prayer, and Bible study.

Sport 
Hopeman is home to Hopeman Golf Club, which was founded in 1909 and has been named in Sky Sports top 18 Scottish holes. Hopeman is also home of Hopeman FC, who are a welfare team that play in the Moray District Welfare League Premier Division. There is also a youth team called Hopeman Dynamos that train young kids aged 5 to 12, some of which have gone on to play for Junior teams like Burghead Thistle or for Lossiemouth FC and other Highland League youth teams as well as Elgin City and Inverness Caledonian Thistle youth teams. One of the first football clubs in Hopeman was Hopeman Rangers.

References

External links

Moray Council
http://www.hopemangala.co.uk

Villages in Moray